The 2011–12 Essex Senior Football League season was the 41st in the history of Essex Senior Football League a football competition in England. Witham Town completed the treble by winning the Essex Senior League, the Challenge Cup and the Gordon Brasted Memorial Trophy.

League table

The league featured 17 clubs which competed in the league last season, along with one new club:
Sporting Bengal United, transferred from the Kent League

Also, Mauritius Sports changed their name to Haringey & Waltham Development.

League table

Essex Senior League Challenge Cup

Preliminary round 
Bethnal Green United 0-0, 2-2 (9-10 on penalties) Eton Manor
Enfield 1893 0-1, 0-0 Haringey & Waltham Development

Round one 
Burnham Ramblers 1-2, 3-0 Hullbridge Sports
Clapton 0-0, 1-3 Basildon United
London APSA 1-3, 1-3 Takeley
Eton Manor 0-1, 3-5 Bowers & Pitsea
Haringey & Waltham Development 0-2, 1-4 Witham Town
Barkingside 3-2, 1-1 Sporting Bengal United
Stansted 2-0 Sawbridgeworth Town (Home Win awarded in second leg)
Barking 1-2, 5-3 Southend Manor

Quarter-finals 
Burnham Ramblers 2-2, 3-0 Basildon United
Takeley 2-0, 2-1 Bowers & Pitsea
Witham Town 3-1, 4-2 Barkingside
Sawbridgeworth Town 1-0, 0-4 Barking

Semi-finals 
Burnham Ramblers 4-0, 4-4 Takeley
Witham Town 2-1, 3-2 Barking

Final 
Burnham Ramblers 1-2 Witham Town

Gordon Brasted Memorial Trophy

Preliminary round 
Sporting Bengal United 4-3 Eton Manor
Hullbridge Sports 2-1 Sawbridgeworth Town

Round one 
Stansted 1-2 London APSA
Sporting Bengal United 2-0 Takeley
Clapton 1-2 Barkingside
Bowers & Pitsea 0-3 Southend Manor
Witham Town 3-1 Barking
Bethnal Green United 3-1 Enfield 1893
Basildon United 1-3 Hullbridge Sports
Haringey & Waltham Development 0-3 Burnham Ramblers

Quarter-finals 
London APSA 1-0 Sporting Bengal United
Barkingside 1-4 Southend Manor
Witham Town 1-0 Bethnal Green United
Hullbridge Sports 1-2 Burnham Ramblers

Semi-finals 
London APSA 2-3 Southend Manor
Witham Town 2-0 Burnham Ramblers

Final 
Southend Manor 0-3 Witham Town

Essex Senior Football League seasons
9